Miklós Páncsics (4 February 1944 – 6 August 2007) was a Hungarian football defender who played for Ferencvárosi TC and Budapest Honvéd FC. He was of Croat origin.

He won a gold medal in football at the 1968 Summer Olympics and a silver medal in football at the 1972 Summer Olympics, and also participated in UEFA Euro 1972. He earned 37 caps for the Hungary national football team. He later became General Secretary of the Hungarian Football Federation (MLSZ) and held a doctor's degree in law.

References 

1944 births
2007 deaths
Association football defenders
Hungarian footballers
Hungary international footballers
Hungarian people of Croatian descent
Ferencvárosi TC footballers
UEFA Euro 1972 players
Olympic footballers of Hungary
Footballers at the 1968 Summer Olympics
Footballers at the 1972 Summer Olympics
Olympic gold medalists for Hungary
Olympic silver medalists for Hungary
Olympic medalists in football
Medalists at the 1972 Summer Olympics
Medalists at the 1968 Summer Olympics